Zakir Hasan can refer to:

 Zakir Hasan (cricketer, born 1972), a Bangladeshi cricketer
 Zakir Hasan (cricketer, born 1998), a Bangladeshi cricketer

See also
 Zakir Hussain (disambiguation)